Mariquita Pérez is a Spanish doll thought up by Mrs Leonor Coello de Portugal in 1938. It was the most famous doll of the 1940s and 1950s in Spain, although it was produced until 1976.  It is regarded as the best doll ever made in Spain as well as one of the best of its time in Europe because of its craft production, the quality of the used materials and the wealth of wardrobe and accessories.
 
Likewise, it had a great success of reception in other countries such as Portugal, Argentina, where it was manufactured too, Venezuela and Cuba.

Doll brands